FC Uralan Plus Moscow was a Russian football team from Moscow. It played professionally from 2000 to 2003 in the Russian Second Division. Their best result was 3rd place in Zone Center in 2002 season. In 2003 season they dropped out of the competition after 8 games due to lack of financing.

Team name history
 1997–1999: FC Moskabelmet Moscow
 2000–2001: FC Lotto-MKM Moscow
 2002–2003: FC Uralan Plus Moscow

External links
  Team history by footballfacts

Association football clubs established in 1997
Association football clubs disestablished in 2003
Defunct football clubs in Moscow
1997 establishments in Russia
2003 disestablishments in Russia